Montreal Lake 106 is an Indian reserve of the Montreal Lake Cree Nation in Saskatchewan. It is 93 kilometres north of Prince Albert.

References

Indian reserves in Saskatchewan
Division No. 18, Saskatchewan
Montreal Lake Cree Nation